A list of films produced in Hong Kong in 1995:.

1995

References

External links
 IMDB list of Hong Kong films
 Hong Kong films of 1995 at HKcinemamagic.com

1995
1995 in Hong Kong
Hong Kong